Rasivalva is a genus of braconid wasps in the family Braconidae. There are about 12 described species in Rasivalva. They are found mainly in the Holarctic, although one species is found in Africa.

Species
These 12 species belong to the genus Rasivalva:

 Rasivalva calceata (Haliday, 1834)
 Rasivalva circumvecta (Lyle, 1918)
 Rasivalva desueta Papp, 1989
 Rasivalva karadagi Tobias, 1986
 Rasivalva leleji Kotenko, 2007
 Rasivalva lepelleyi (Wilkinson, 1934)
 Rasivalva longivena Song & Chen, 2004
 Rasivalva marginata (Nees, 1834)
 Rasivalva perplexa (Muesebeck, 1922)
 Rasivalva pyrenaica Oltra & Jiménez, 2005
 Rasivalva rugosa (Muesebeck, 1922)
 Rasivalva stigmatica (Muesebeck, 1922)

References

Further reading

 
 
 

Microgastrinae